Sinistrofulgur is a genus of large sea snails with left-handed shell-coiling, marine gastropod mollusks in the subfamily Busyconinae.

Species

References

 Hollister S.C. 1958, A review of the genus Busycon and its allies - Part I: Palaeontographica Americana IV(28): 48-126, pls. 8-18
 Petuch E.J., Myers R.F. & Berschauer D.P. (2015). The living and fossil Busycon whelks: Iconic mollusks of eastern North America. San Diego Shell Club. viii + 195 pp.

 
Busyconinae
Gastropod genera